Argentina participated at the 2017 Summer Universiade in Taipei, Taiwan with 178 competitors in 16 sports.

Archery

Athletics

Men

Track Events

Field Events

Women

Track Events

Field Events

Combined Events - Heptathlon

Badminton

Basketball

Men's tournament

Preliminary Round

|}

Quarterfinals

Women's tournament

Preliminary Round

|}

9th-16th-place game

9th-12th-place game

11th-place game

Fencing

Football

Men's tournament

Preliminary Round

Quarterfinals

5th-8th Semifinals

7th-place game

Women's tournament

Preliminary Round

9th-13th Place Quarterfinal

Golf

Gymnastics

Judo

Men

Women

Swimming

Men

Women

Table Tennis

Taekwondo

Tennis

Volleyball

Men's tournament

Preliminary Round

|}

|}

Quarterfinals

|}

5th-8th-place semifinals

|}

5th-place match

|}

Women's tournament

Preliminary Round

|}

|}

Quarterfinals

|}

5th-8th-place semifinals

|}

7th-place match

|}

Water Polo

Men's tournament

Preliminary Round

9th–16th Place Quarterfinals

13th–16th-place semifinals

15th-place match

Women's tournament

Preliminary Round

9th-12th-place semifinals

11th-place match

Wushu

References

Nations at the 2017 Summer Universiade
2017 in Argentine sport